A cachet is a design or inscription other than a cancellation or pre-printed postage.

Cachet may also refer to:

People 
Given name
 Cachet Lue (born 1997), Canadian-born Jamaican footballer

Surname
 Carel Adolph Lion Cachet (1864–1945), Dutch designer, printmaker and ceramist
 Louis Cachet (born 1973), Norwegian musician and murderer

Other uses 
 Cachet (horse), a racehorse
 Cachet, Markham, a neighbourhood of Markham, Ontario, Canada
 Reputation
 Seal (emblem), an impression printed on, embossed upon, or affixed to a document
 Lettres de cachet, letters signed by the king of France, countersigned by one of his ministers, and closed with the royal seal